The Ambassador from Israel to Romania is Israel's foremost diplomatic representative in Romania.

List of ambassadors
David Sarranga 2019 -
Tamar Sam-Ash 2015 - 2018
Dan Ben-Eliezer 2010 - 2015
Oren David 2007 - 2010 
Rodica Radian-Gordon 2003 - 2007
Sandu Mazor 2001 - 2003
Avraham Millo 1996 - 2001 
Zvi Mazel 1989 - 1992
Yosef Govrin 1985 - 1989
Zvi Brosh 1982 - 1985
Aba Gefen 1978 - 1982
Shamay Cahana 1976 - 1978
Yohanan Cohen 1973 - 1976
Ambassador Rafael Benshalom 1969 - 1973
Minister Eliezer Doron 1966 - 1969
Minister Zvi Ayalon 1964 - 1966
Minister Katriel Salmon 1961 - 1963
Minister Shmuel Bendor 1959 - 1961
Minister Aria Harel 1957 - 1959
Minister Zeev Argaman 1954 - 1956
Minister Ehud Avriel 1950 - 1951
Minister Reuven Rubin 1948 - 1950

References

Romania
Israel